Lipogya eutheta, the grey bark moth, is a moth of the family Geometridae first described by Alfred Jefferis Turner in 1917. It is found in the Australian states of Queensland, New South Wales, and Victoria.

References

Boarmiini